Diego Antonio Caccia (born 9 March 1971 in Buenos Aires), known as Diego Torres, is an Argentine two Grammy Award-nominated pop singer, songwriter, composer, musician and actor (of films, theater and television). He is the son of the legendary Argentine artist Lolita Torres (1930–2002).

Early life
Diego Torres was born in Buenos Aires, Argentina. He's the son of popular argentine singer and actress Lolita Torres.

Career
In 1989, Torres' music career began with a band called "La Marca." Later, he began his first steps on TV starring in the successful TV series "La Banda del Golden Rocket" which stayed on air for three years. He loves soccer. Torres has won 3 awards along with 17 nominations for the Latin Grammys.

In 1992 he launched his first album, "Diego Torres," produced by Cachorro López. This album was rewarded 3 times platinum.
Two years later, and a little distant from TV, he launched his second album called "Tratar de estar mejor" which received 5 platinum albums in Argentina and gold and platinum albums in other Latin American countries. This album launched Torres to the international scene.

In 1996 the Italian producer Celso Valli produced Torres' third album, "Luna Nueva", and months later Diego started touring with his band all across Latin America, United States, and Spain. The album went on sale, soon reaching gold and quickly being rewarded with the platinum in Argentina.

In 1999 he recorded his fourth album called "Tal Cual Es", produced by Cachorro López. This album showed Diego's talent and creativity to compose and mix different Latin sounds, such as flamenco guitars as well as various other tropical sounds.

His next album was named "Un Mundo Diferente" which was recorded in the second half of 2001 in Buenos Aires and Miami. This album presents a variety of styles and merges with several Latin rhythm styles in most songs, such as in his most successful song so far, "Color Esperanza", which stayed at the top of the Argentine Singles/Airplay Chart for twelve consecutive weeks. The album received a Grammy Award nomination in 2003.

2004 brought a new challenge to Diego: the possibility of recording an MTV Unplugged, which aired in the MTV networks of Brazil, Latin America, Spain and United States. The reconversion of the acoustics in some of his hits along with the presentation of his new themes were part of this show, which was also produced on CD and DVD.

In 2006 he released his sixth studio album "Andando", proceeded by the lead single "Abriendo Caminos" featuring Dominican singer-songwriter Juan Luis Guerra. In 2005 he received the Platinum Konex Award as best Argentine male pop/ballad singer, shared with Sandro de América.

In 2010 he released his seventh studio album "Distinto" featuring his first the number-one Billboard Hot Latin Song single "Guapa".

Filmography

TV
1989: Nosotros y los otros
1991: El gordo y el flaco
1991–1993: La Banda del Golden Rocket
2011: Los únicos 
2013: Los Vecinos en Guerra

Theater
1990: Pajáros in the Nait
1991: El Zorro
1992: La Banda del Golden Rocket

Film
1988: El profesor Punk
1994: Una sombra ya pronto serás
1997: La furia
1999: La venganza
2003: El juego de Arcibel
2012: Extraños en la noche

Discography

Studio albums
1992: Diego Torres
1994: Tratar de Estar Mejor
1996: Luna Nueva
1999: Tal Cual Es
2001: Un Mundo Diferente
2006: Andando
2010: Distinto
2015: Buena Vida
2021: Atlántico a Pie

Live albums
2004: MTV Unplugged

Compilation albums
2008: Un Cachito de Mí: Grandes Éxitos
2008: Todos Éxitos

Other albums
1991: Compañías Indias (with his former group La Marca)

Awards

Nominations
 2013 Martín Fierro Awards
 Best actor of daily comedy (for Los vecinos en guerra)

See also
List of singer-songwriters

References

External links

21st-century Argentine male singers
20th-century Argentine male singers
Latin music songwriters
1971 births
Living people
Singers from Buenos Aires
Argentine people of Spanish descent
Sony Music Latin artists
Universal Music Latin Entertainment artists
Argentine people of Italian descent
Argentine male singer-songwriters